Charles Frederic Swigert Jr. Memorial Fountain is an outdoor 1983 bronze and stone fountain and sculpture by Richard Beyer, installed at the Oregon Zoo in Portland, Oregon.

Description
The figure group, installed at the Oregon Zoo, depicts a man talking to a standing female child and several animals, including an ape, lion, monkey, two wolves and a wolf cub. The man is shown with a monkey behind him and a lion and wolf cub at his feet. The installation measures approximately  x  x . Accompanying the fountain is a plaque which reads: "THE / CHARLES FREDERIC SWIGERT JR. / MEMORIAL FOUNTAIN / GIVEN BY CHRISTINE SWIGERT / IN MEMORY OF HER HUSBAND. / BESIDE THE WATER / LIFE AND THE WORLD CAN BE FOUND / I THINK OF A FRIEND / SCULPTURE BY RICH BEYER / DEDICATED ON AUGUST 1, 1983".

History
The memorial was created by Richard Beyer and dedicated on August 1, 1983. It was a gift of Christine Swigert in memory of her husband Charles Frederic Swigert Jr. The memorial's condition was deemed "treatment needed" by the Smithsonian Institution's "Save Outdoor Sculpture!" program in February 1994.

See also

 1983 in art

References

1983 establishments in Oregon
1983 sculptures
Bronze sculptures in Oregon
Fountains in Portland, Oregon
Monkeys in art
Monuments and memorials in Portland, Oregon
Oregon Zoo
Outdoor sculptures in Portland, Oregon
Sculptures of lions
Statues in Portland, Oregon
Wolves in art